Anupam Sen (1920s-2015) was an Indian physician and politician belonging to All India Trinamool Congress. He was elected as MLA of Jalpaiguri Vidhan Sabha Constituency in West Bengal Legislative Assembly in 1971, 1972, 1991 and 1996. He died on 7 September 2015 at the age of 89.

References

2015 deaths
Trinamool Congress politicians from West Bengal
West Bengal MLAs 1971–1972
West Bengal MLAs 1972–1977
West Bengal MLAs 1991–1996
West Bengal MLAs 1996–2001
Medical doctors from West Bengal
1920s births
Year of birth uncertain